Robert Joseph Coyle (born September 23, 1964) is an American prelate of the Roman Catholic Church who has been serving as auxiliary bishop of the Diocese of Rockville Centre in New York since 2018.  He previously served as an auxiliary bishop of the Archdiocese for the Military Services, USA from 2013 to 2018

Biography
Robert Coyle was born on September 23, 1964 in Brooklyn, New York.  He was ordained a priest on May 25, 1991, for the Diocese of Rockville Centre by John R. McGann.

Auxiliary Bishop for the Military Services, USA
On February 11, 2013, Coye was named by Pope Benedict XVI as titular bishop of Zabi and auxiliary bishop of the Archdiocese for the Military Services, USA.  He was  consecrated by Archbishop Timothy Broglio on April 25, 2013.

Auxiliary Bishop of Rockville Centre
On February 20, 2018, Coyle was appointed by Pope Francis as auxiliary bishop for the Diocese of Rockville Centre; he was installed on April 2, 2018. On Sunday May 6, 2018, Coyle was announced to be the incoming pastor of Good Shepherd Parish in Holbrook, New York.

See also

 Catholic Church hierarchy
 Catholic Church in the United States
 Historical list of the Catholic bishops of the United States
 Insignia of Chaplain Schools in the US Military
 List of Catholic bishops of the United States
 List of Catholic bishops of the United States: military service
 Lists of patriarchs, archbishops, and bishops
 Military chaplain
 Religious symbolism in the United States military
 United States military chaplains

References

External links 

The Roman Catholic Diocese of Rockville Centre Official Site
 Archdiocese for the Military Services of the United States. GCatholic.org. Retrieved 2010-08-20.

 

1964 births
Living people
People from Brooklyn
21st-century American Roman Catholic titular bishops
American military chaplains
Catholics from New York (state)